The Thirst (2017) is a crime novel by Norwegian writer  Jo Nesbø, the eleventh in the Harry Hole series.

Plot
The novel features a killer who returns from Harry Hole's past and whom he failed to apprehend previously, but with a frightening new method of killing his victims by biting the victim's body with manufactured iron teeth and, apparently, drinking their blood, similar to the classic idea of a vampire.

Reference list

External links

Harry Hole (novel series)
Norwegian crime novels
2017 Norwegian novels
21st-century Norwegian novels